The Medway Village Historic District encompasses a historic 19th century industrial village in southeastern Medway, Massachusetts.  The village grew as a consequence of the textile industry that developed on the Charles River in the area beginning in the later years of the 18th century, and running through most of the 19th century.  The district is an area covering  that includes more than 240 historically significant structures, most of which were built between 1831 and 1897.

The district was listed on the National Register of Historic Places in 2008.

See also
National Register of Historic Places listings in Norfolk County, Massachusetts

References

National Register of Historic Places in Norfolk County, Massachusetts
Georgian architecture in Massachusetts
Federal architecture in Massachusetts
Historic districts on the National Register of Historic Places in Massachusetts
Medway, Massachusetts